Spartanburg County School District 6 (SCSD6) is a public school district in Spartanburg County, South Carolina, US. Led by superintendent Dr. Darryl Owings, the district operates thirteen schools.

It serves western Spartanburg as well as Arcadia, Fairforest, Glenn Springs, Pauline, Roebuck, and most of Arkwright, Hilltop, Saxon and Southern Shops.

List of schools

Elementary schools  

 Anderson Mill Elementary
 Arcadia Elementary
 Fairforest Elementary
 Jesse S. Bobo Elementary
 Lone Oak Elementary 
 Pauline-Glenn Springs Elementary
 Roebuck Elementary
 West View Elementary
 Woodland Heights Elementary

Middle and junior high schools 

 Fairforest Middle
 Gable Middle
 R. P. Dawkins Middle

High schools

 Dorman Freshman Campus
 Dorman High School
 RD Anderson Applied Technology Center

References

External links
Spartanburg School District 6 homepage

School districts in South Carolina
Education in Spartanburg County, South Carolina
Spartanburg, South Carolina